Antonio Radić (born 16 June 1987), better known as agadmator, is a Croatian YouTuber and chess player. He has one of the most popular chess channels on YouTube, and he previously had the most subscribers of any YouTube chess channel from 2018 until late 2021 when he was surpassed by GothamChess. Although he does not participate in many international chess tournaments, he is active on various online chess platforms, including Lichess and Chess.com, surpassing 1,000,000 subscribers on 7 February 2021, the first chess channel to do so. As of November 2022 the videos on Radić's channel have over 661 million views in total, the third most of any individual chess-centric YouTuber (eclipsed only by Levy Rozman, who has over 854 million views, and ChessBase India, which has more than 832 million views). On his channel, Radić reviews both recent games, such as Grand Chess Tour events, and historical matches. He occasionally features chess compositions.

Background
Radić is a resident of Križevci, Croatia, and was introduced to chess at the age of four by his grandfather Anto Krnjić, a FIDE Master. He later stopped playing and did not return to chess until he was 17 years old. Radić's peak FIDE rating of 2010 was achieved in July 2010, and his current rating is 1961.

YouTube channel
Radić originally began his YouTube channel in 2007 while he was working with his father, who had a job as a wedding videographer. He posted wedding videos to promote their business. He began posting chess videos in 2016. Once his subscriber count surpassed 20,000, he left his job as a graphic designer to focus entirely on his YouTube channel. Radić quit his regular job as an assistant to his father's wedding photography business to focus on the channel full time.  
Almost all of Radić's videos follow the same format: a detailed analysis of one chess game. He typically posts new videos on a daily basis and consistently reviews games from big tournaments within 24 hours. Many of his reviews of historical games are organized into series; for example, games from the World Chess Championship 1921 match. 
His most popular video is titled "The Greatest Queen Sacrifice in Chess History", which has over 7.1 million views as of November 2022. In the video, he analyzes a game between Rashid Nezhmetdinov and Oleg Chernikov from 1962.

Radić also started a podcast called The agadmator Podcast in 2020, which is hosted on his YouTube channel and on other platforms. He also has another channel, on which he posts videos of him playing video games.
On 7 February 2021, he became the first chess content creator to cross the million-subscriber mark.

References

External links
Official website

 (Github database of videos searchable by filters, or moves entered into a chessboard.)

Living people
1987 births
People from Križevci
Croatian chess players
Croatian YouTubers
Gaming YouTubers